CCAAT/enhancer-binding protein beta is a protein that in humans is encoded by the CEBPB gene.

Function 

The protein encoded by this intronless gene is a bZIP transcription factor that can bind as a homodimer to certain DNA regulatory regions. It can also form heterodimers with the related proteins CEBP-alpha, CEBP-delta, and CEBP-gamma. The encoded protein is important in the regulation of genes involved in immune and inflammatory responses and has been shown to bind to the IL-1 response element in the IL-6 gene, as well as to regulatory regions of several acute-phase and cytokine genes. In addition, the encoded protein can bind the promoter and upstream element and stimulate the expression of the collagen type I gene.

CEBP-beta is critical for normal macrophage functioning, an important immune cell sub-type; mice unable to express CEBP-beta have macrophages that cannot differentiate (specialize) and thus are unable to perform all their biological functions - including macrophage-mediated muscle repair. Observational work has shown that expression of CEBP-beta in blood leukocytes is positively associated with muscle strength in humans, emphasizing the importance of the immune system, and particularly macrophages, in the maintenance of muscle function.

Function of CEBPB gene can be effectively examined by siRNA knockdown based on an independent validation.

Target genes 

CEBPB is capable of increasing the expression of several target genes.  Among them, some have specific role in the nervous system such as the preprotachykinin-1 gene, giving rise to substance P and neurokinin A and the choline acetyltransferase responsible for the biosynthesis of the important neurotransmitter acetylcholine.
Other targets include genes coding for cytokines such as IL-6, IL-4, IL-5, and TNF-alpha.
Genes coding for transporter proteins that confer multidrug resistance to the cells have also been found to be activated by CEBPB. Such genes include ABCC2 and ABCB1.

Interactions 

CEBPB has been shown to interact with:

 CREB1, 
 CRSP3 
 DNA damage-inducible transcript 3, 
 EP300, 
 Estrogen receptor alpha, 
 Glucocorticoid receptor, 
 HMGA1, 
 HSF1, 
 Nucleolar phosphoprotein p130, 
 RELA, 
 Serum response factor,
 SMARCA2, 
 Sp1 transcription factor, 
 TRIM28,  and
 Zif268.

See also 
 Ccaat-enhancer-binding proteins

References

External links 
 
 
 

Transcription factors